Du Xinyuan (1905–1985) birth name Du Chunren, was a People's Republic of China politician. He was born in Wutai County, Xinzhou, Shanxi Province. He joined the Chinese Communist Party in 1927, while studying at Beijing Normal University. He was CPPCC Committee Chairman of Sichuan Province. He was a delegate to the 4th, 5th and 6th National People's Congress.

References

1905 births
1985 deaths
People's Republic of China politicians from Shanxi
Chinese Communist Party politicians from Shanxi
Political office-holders in Sichuan
Beijing Normal University alumni
Politicians from Xinzhou
Delegates to the 4th National People's Congress
Du
Delegates to the 6th National People's Congress